John Joseph Williams (August 18, 1931 – July 28, 1985), known as Grant Williams, was an American film, theater, and television actor. He is best remembered for his portrayal of Scott Carey in the science fiction film The Incredible Shrinking Man (1957), and for his starring role as Greg MacKenzie on Hawaiian Eye from 1960 through 1963.

Early life
Born in New York City, his parents were Thomas Williams, originally from Scotland, and Helen Tewes Williams. Williams had one younger brother. Williams began acting in summer stock as a child.

Military service
After graduating from high school, he enlisted in the United States Air Force, serving from September 1948 to September 1952, before and during the Korean War. He was discharged as an Air Force staff sergeant.

Higher education
It would seem that Williams attended one or more colleges after his Air Force stint, but the sources are deeply discordant about which. He had, in fact, enrolled in Queens College, Flushing, New York, but cut his attendance short when he enlisted. Among the universities cited by the various sources are: the University of Illinois, City College of New York, Columbia University, and New York University. According to Rual Askew of the Dallas Morning News, who interviewed Williams in March 1957 and published a profile of the actor, Williams earned a BA in journalism from New York University. According to other press sources (such as a February 1959 syndicated article in the Daily Herald of Provo, Utah), Williams obtained a degree in journalism from a correspondence school.

Stage career
After his Air Force service, he enrolled at the Actors Studio in New York City under Lee Strasberg. 

During auditions held at the Town Hall Club in New York City in May 1953, Williams was selected for a summer scholarship at the Barter Theatre by Rosalind Russell. The "Barter Colony" at Abingdon, Virginia is a unique training ground for actors, providing instruction in all forms of stagecraft. It was a popular choice for many recently discharged veterans, such as John Vivyan and Ernest Borgnine, who found the communal lifestyle a comfortable buffer before rejoining the civilian world. Williams spent the entire summer of 1953 there, performing in plays (see Stage performances) that on occasion starred an established professional. According to contemporary Barter publicity, he had at least five previous stage credits in Golden Boy, Angel Street, The Heiress, All My Sons, and The Glass Menagerie, but for which the roles and venues are not known.

Following his summer at Barter, Williams next performed in the Off-Broadway Blackfriars Guild Theatre. Late Arrival was staged in October 1953, wherein Williams played a suitor to the young female lead. Though he had used "Grant Williams" all throughout his Barter tenure, he was now billed as "John J. Williams". He returned to using "Grant Williams" as the lead for a summer stock production of Rope during July 1954.

Williams' early theatrical experience was intensive, but, contrary to what several Internet sources (and Williams himself) have stated, never included Broadway. His work in the theater was all "off-Broadway", at prestigious venues such as the Blackfriars Theatre in New York (1953).

Screen career
Following small roles on television, Williams was spotted by a talent scout on Kraft Television Theater in 1954 and signed with Universal Pictures in March 1955. He made his film debut in Jack Arnold's Red Sundown in March of the following year in the small but memorable bravura role of hired thug Chet Swann.

This film was followed by another picture directed by Arnold, the noir thriller Outside the Law (1956), by the western Showdown at Abilene (1956), by some small uncredited roles, and by the middling CinemaScope romantic comedy Four Girls in Town (1957).

In his most memorable role, Williams starred as Scott Carey in his seventh film, the Hugo Award-winning science fiction film The Incredible Shrinking Man (1957), with Randy Stuart playing his wife, Louise. Despite good reviews and the success of the film, his career continued with only lackluster roles. Universal Pictures dropped his contract in 1959, and he signed in 1960 with Warner Brothers, where he had a continuing role as the private detective Greg McKenzie on Hawaiian Eye, co-starring Robert Conrad, Anthony Eisley, and Connie Stevens.

Several film and television roles followed.  In 1959 Williams played Col. Geo. Custer on the show Yancy Derringer, later that year he played a killer cowboy named “Joe Plummer” on the TV Western Gunsmoke, and the role of the psychopathic killer in Robert Bloch's The Couch (1962), but fame still eluded him. He made two guest appearances on Perry Mason, in 1964 as columnist and murderer Quincy Davis in "The Case of the Ruinous Road," and as defendant Dr. Todd Meade in the 1965 episode "The Case of the Baffling Bug."

He starred as troubled military psychologist Major Douglas McKinnon in The Outer Limits episode "The Brain of Colonel Barham" along with former Hawaiian Eye co-star Anthony Eisley. Also in 1965, Williams played the title character (Albert "Patch" Saunders) in the Bonanza episode "Patchwork Man," as well as the 1960 episode "Escape to Ponderosa."

Williams attempted a comedic role on the radio airwaves in the anthology program Family Theater (September 11, 1957, the show's last episode), and there was some light-heartedness to his delightful role as Mike Carter in the half-hour episode "Millionaire Gilbert Burton" (April 29, 1959) of the series The Millionaire. As his acting career declined, he opened a drama school in West Hollywood. According to earlier versions of this article, he also wrote several books on acting, though his acting students never mention them in the extensive interviews included in Stampalia's biography, and there appears to be no trace of their publication. Williams continued to act occasionally in both movies and television, but without much conviction and in inferior products. His last released film appearance was in Doomsday Machine (1972); however, as it was actually shot in 1967, Brain of Blood (1972) was his last acting work for the screen. His last TV appearance was in 1983 on the game show Family Feud along with other former cast members from Hawaiian Eye.

Life and death
Williams died on July 28, 1985, of peritonitis at the Veterans Administration Hospital in Los Angeles and was buried in the Los Angeles National Cemetery.

Williams never married but was survived by a brother. He was a cousin, or rather great-nephew, of Scottish opera singer Mary Garden.

Stage performances

Selected filmography

Red Sundown (1956)
Outside the Law (1956)
Showdown at Abilene (1956)
Written on the Wind (1956)
Four Girls in Town (1957)
The Incredible Shrinking Man (1957)
The Monolith Monsters (1957)
Lone Texan (1959)
The Peter Tchaikovsky Story (1959)
13 Fighting Men (1960)
The Leech Woman (1960)
Susan Slade (1961)
The Couch (1962) (screenplay by Robert Bloch)
PT 109 (1963)
Brain of Blood (1971)
Doomsday Machine (shot in 1967, completed and released in 1972)

Notes

References

External links

1931 births
1985 deaths
20th-century American male actors
American people of Scottish descent
American people of Irish descent
American male film actors
American male television actors
Male actors from New York City
People from Manhattan
United States Air Force airmen
United States Air Force personnel of the Korean War
Deaths from peritonitis
Burials at Los Angeles National Cemetery